Piechowski is a surname. Notable people with the surname include:

 Kazimierz Piechowski (1919–2017), Polish prisoner
 Laurin von Piechowski (born 1994), German footballer
 Mateusz Piechowski (born 1995), Polish handball player
 Paul Piechowski (1892–1966), Lutheran theologian and physician